Leila Alice Denmark (née Daughtry; February 1, 1898 – April 1, 2012) was an American pediatrician in Atlanta, Georgia. She was the world's oldest practicing pediatrician until her retirement in May 2001 at the age of 103, after 73 years. She was a supercentenarian, living to the age of 114 years, 60 days.

A co-developer of the pertussis (whooping cough) vaccine, Denmark was one of the few supercentenarians in history to gain prominence in life for reasons other than longevity. She started treating children in 1928. By the time of her retirement, Denmark was treating grandchildren and great-grandchildren of her first patients.

Early life and education

Born in Portal, Georgia, Leila Alice Daughtry was the third of 12 children of Elerbee and Alice Cornelia (Hendricks) Daughtry. Her paternal uncle was Missouri Congressman James Alexander Daugherty. She was the older sister of Clyde Daughtry (1910–85), who is known for shooting the only known authentic color footage of the attack on Pearl Harbor.

She attended Tift College in Forsyth, Georgia, where she trained to be a teacher. She studied chemistry and physics at Mercer University in Macon. She decided to attend medical school when her fiancé John Eustace Denmark (1899–1990) was posted to Java, Dutch Indies, by the United States Department of State, as no wives were allowed to accompany their spouses to that post.

Daughtry was the only woman in the 1928 graduating class of the Medical College of Georgia in Augusta, and the third woman ever to graduate from the school with a medical degree.

John Eustace Denmark had returned from his overseas assignment and they married on June 11, 1928, soon after she received her medical diploma. They had one child together, Mary, on November 19, 1930. Leila Denmark was a registered Democrat and a practicing Baptist.

Medical career

Denmark accepted a residency at Grady Memorial Hospital in Atlanta, Georgia, and moved to the Virginia-Highland neighborhood with her husband. Denmark was the first physician on staff when Henrietta Egleston Hospital, a pediatric hospital, opened on the Emory University campus. She also developed a private practice, seeing patients in a clinic at her home.

Denmark devoted a substantial amount of her professional time to charity. By 1935, she was a listed staff member at the Presbyterian Church Baby Clinic in Atlanta, while serving at Grady and maintaining a private practice. She conducted research from the 1930s, and especially from 1933 to 1944 in the diagnosis, treatment, and immunization of whooping cough, then frequently fatal to children. Denmark is credited as co-developer of the pertussis (whooping cough) vaccine, with support from Eli Lilly and Company, and Emory University. For this, she was awarded the Fisher Prize in 1935.

Denmark discussed her views on child-rearing in her book Every Child Should Have a Chance (1971). She was among the first doctors to object to adults smoking cigarettes around children, and to pregnant women using drugs. She believed that drinking cow's milk is harmful. She also recommended that children and adults should eat fresh fruit rather than drinking fruit juices, and drink only water. On March 9, 2000, the Georgia General Assembly honored Denmark in a resolution.

Later life

She wrote a second book, with Madia Bowman, titled Dr. Denmark Said It!: Advice for Mothers from America's Most Experienced Pediatrician written in 2002. Denmark later retired in 2002 because her eyesight was getting too weak for more involved tasks, such as examining children's throats.

Denmark lived independently in her Cumming, Georgia home until age 106. She moved to Athens, Georgia to live with her only child, Mary (Denmark) Hutcherson. On February 1, 2008, Denmark celebrated her 110th birthday, becoming a supercentenarian. According to Hutcherson, Denmark's health deteriorated severely in the autumn of 2008 but later improved as she neared her 111th birthday. She died in 2012 at the age of 114 and 2 months. She was one of the few supercentenarians notable for something other than their longevity. A new Forsyth County, Georgia high school constructed 2016-2018 is located near her former home and is named after Dr. Denmark.

Awards and honors 
 1935, the Fisher Award for "outstanding research in diagnosis, treatment, and immunization of whooping cough for her work on the vaccine" 
 1953, named Atlanta's Woman of the Year 
 1970, Distinguished Service Citation from Tift College as a "devout humanitarian who has invested her life in pediatric services to all families without respect to economic status, race, or national origin…. Devoted Humanitarian, Doctor par excellence, Generous Benefactor." 
 1980, Distinguished Alumni Award, Tift College 
 1980, Community Service Award, sponsored by television station WXIA, Atlanta, Georgia 
 1981, Book of Golden deeds Award, Buckhead Exchange Club, Atlanta 
 1982, Citation, Citizens of Portal, Georgia, jointly with her husband, John Eustace Denmark, for Outstanding Achievement and Service 
 1989, Shining Light Award, Atlanta Gas Light Company 
 1998, Lifetime Achievement Award, Atlanta Business Chronicle 
 2000, Georgia General Assembly passed a resolution honoring her
 2000, Heroes, Saints and Legends Award, Wesley Woods 
 2000, Honorary doctorate, Emory University
 2016, a new high school in Forsyth County, Georgia, to be opened in 2018, was named in her memory.
 2019, named to the Georgia Women of Achievement hall of fame

See also
List of centenarians (medical professionals)
100 oldest American people ever

References

External links
 Keenlyside, Barbara. "Dr. Leila Denmark's secret: Love what you do," Atlanta Business Chronicle, 24 July 1998. 
 Meyer, M.D., Charles R. "The Graying Physician," 'MMA Publications', August 2006. 
 Report on Leila Denmark's supercentenarian status, Online Athens
 Newspaper report of Denmark's 112th birthday, Online Athens
 Obituary: Dr. Leila Denmark, The Telegraph (UK)

1898 births
2012 deaths
American pediatricians
Women pediatricians
American supercentenarians
People from Portal, Georgia
People from Athens, Georgia
Georgia Health Sciences University alumni
Physicians from Georgia (U.S. state)
People from Forsyth, Georgia
Georgia (U.S. state) Democrats
Women supercentenarians